Lists of books based on Doctor Who cover different types of book in the Doctor Who media franchise.
These include novels, audiobooks, and short story anthologies. The lists are organized by publisher and imprint.

Doctor Who novelisations
The novelisations of TV episodes were published from 1973 onwards by various publishers, including:
 Between 1964 and 1966,  three books based on First Doctor serials were published in hardcover by Frederick Muller Ltd.
 Between 1973 and 1991, Target Books published 156 books, covering almost every Doctor Who television story that was originally broadcast from 1963 to 1989. The Target Books imprint was also used for five books in 2018 and seven books published in 2021.
 Between 1996 and 2019, BBC Books also published 12 other novelizations of TV episodes and other works.

Virgin Books novel series
Novel series published by Virgin Books: 
Virgin New Adventures: Published from 1991 to 1999, these continued the story of the Doctor from the point at which the television programme went into hiatus from television in 1989. They featured the Seventh Doctor from 1991 to 1997, plus one book with the Eighth Doctor. From 1997 to 1999, they focused on Bernice Summerfield and the Doctor did not appear. 83 books were published in this series.
Virgin Missing Adventures: Published from 1994 to 1997, these featured the First through Sixth Doctors with stories set between televised episodes of the programme. They complemented the Virgin New Adventures range. 33 books were published in this series.
Virgin Decalog: Published from 1994 to 1997, these each contained ten short stories. Volumes 4 and 5 did not feature the Doctor or any other non-Virgin copyrighted characters after the BBC decided not to renew Virgin's licence to produce original fiction featuring the Doctor or any characters featured in the TV series.  Five volumes were published in this series.

BBC Books novel series
Novel series published by BBC Books:
Eighth Doctor Adventures: Published from 1997 to 2005, these featured the Eighth Doctor (who had appeared in one TV episode only). 73 books were published in this series.
Past Doctor Adventures: Published from 1997 to 2005, these featured First through Seventh Doctors, following the lead set by Virgin Missing Adventures series. 76 books were published in this series.
BBC Short Trips: Published from 1998 to 2000, these were short story anthologies, following a pattern established by the Virgin Decalog series. Three volumes were published in this series.
New Series Adventures: Published from 2005 (and still active), these feature the Ninth Doctor onwards. The featured Doctor aligns with the active TV series. As of April 2020, 64 standard-length novels and six larger "supersize" novels.

Other series
Make Your Own Adventure/Find Your Fate: In 1986, a series of six multiple-plot concept books by several authors was published in parallel by Severn House as Make Your Own Adventure With Dr Who and Ballantine Books as Find Your Fate: Dr Who. Each volume allows for different progressions based on the readers decisions and dice rolls: Search for the Doctor, Crisis in Space, Garden of Evil, Mission to Venus, Invasion of the Ormazoids and Race Against Time.
Telos Doctor Who novellas: Published from 2001 to 2005 by Telos Publishing. 15 books were published. 
Big Finish Short Trips: Published from 2001 to 2009 by Big Finish Productions, these are short story anthologies. The name was inherited the BBC Short Trips series, which was discontinued by BBC Books for cost reasons. Big Finish Productions negotiated a licence to continue producing these collections, publishing them in hardback to allow for a higher cover price. 28 volumes were published in this series.
List of Doctor Who audiobooks (various publishers)

References